Christian August Naumann (1705 – 1766) was a German architect.

Naumann's designs included the Luisenstädtische Kirche and Holy Trinity Church, both in Berlin.  Neither building is standing today.

Sources

Erich Donnert. Unbekannte Quellen, Aufsätze zu Entwicklung, Vorstufen, Grenzen und Fortwirken der Frühneuzeit in und um Europa, Inhaltsverzeichnisse der Bände 1 - 6, Personenregister der Bände 1 - 7: Festschrift für Günter Mühlpfordt [zum 85. Geburtstag]. Böhlau Verlag Köln Weimar; 2008 [cited October 14, 2012]. German. . p. 482.

1705 births
1766 deaths
18th-century German architects
Place of death unknown
Place of birth missing